Time Wars may refer to:

Time War (Doctor Who), a conflict mentioned in the television series Doctor Who
TimeWars, a series of science fiction novels by Simon Hawke
"Time Wars", a story arc from Marvel's Transformers comics